A pinch is a small, indefinite amount of a substance, typically a powder like salt, sugar, spice, or snuff. It is the "amount that can be taken between the thumb and forefinger". 

References

Customary units of measurement 
Cooking weights and measures
Units of volume